GGV Capital is a global venture capital firm that invests in seed-to-growth stage investments across Consumer/New Retail, Social/Internet, Enterprise/Cloud and Smart Tech sectors.

The firm was established in 2000 in Singapore and Silicon Valley, and manages $9.2 billion in capital across 17 funds.

Background 
Formerly known as Granite Global Ventures, GGV Capital was founded in 2000. The firm is led by six managing partners - Jixun Foo, Jenny Lee, Hans Tung, Glenn Solomon, Eric Xu and Jeff Richards. The investment team consists of over a dozen investment professionals around the world.

Investments 
Since its founding, GGV has invested in more than 200 active companies across the United States, Latin America, Israel, Southeast Asia, China and India, with over 56 of which are valued at over $1 billion. According to the Center for Security and Emerging Technology, GGV is "most active in financing Chinese AI companies."

GGV is focused on partnering with founders and companies that use technology to create transformative social and economic opportunities in emerging markets.

In December 2020, GGV co-led the 30 million series B funding round for Boston technology company, Fairmarkit. The round was also co-led by Insight Partners, and had continued support from 1984 VC, New Stack, and NewFund.

In January 2021, the firm closed on $2.52 billion over 4 funds, including $1.5 billion for its eight flagship fund, $366 million for an opportunity fund, $80 million for a founder network fund, and $160 million for a discovery fund.

References

External links
 

Financial services companies established in 2000
Companies based in Menlo Park, California
Privately held companies based in California
Venture capital firms of the United States